Joshua White may refer to:
 Josh White (1914–1969), American musician and civil rights activist
 Josh White Jr., his son, American musician
 Joshua White (politician) (1812–1890), businessman and Illinois state legislator
 Joshua White (artist) (born 1942), visual musician of The Joshua Light Show
 Josh White (journalist), journalist at the Washington Post and elsewhere
 Josh White (American football) (born 1977), American football player
 Josh White (Christian musician) (born 1973), Christian musician and lead singer of the worship band Telecast
 Josh White (racing driver) (born 1991), American stock car driver and Marine